Chukuma Modu (born 19 June 1990) is an English actor best known for his roles in Game of Thrones, The Good Doctor and The 100.

Biography
Modu was born to a Nigerian-German father and an Anglo-Irish mother in Chiswick, West London. He initially had an interest in sports, particularly boxing, and trained at the age of twelve. He would also visit the theatre and become cultured with the performances. In 2012, Modu attended the Richmond Drama School and has since begun his acting career.

Modu made his debut as a minor background character in Me Before You before making a recurring appearance on the HBO series Game of Thrones as Aggo. He joined the main cast of The Good Doctor as Dr. Jared Kalu, but did not return when the series was renewed for a second season. He also had a role in the 2019 Marvel Studios film Captain Marvel.
Modu is also the narrator on 'The Moment of Proof', a 2021 made true-crime television documentary series telling the stories of police investigations.

Filmography

References

External links
 

Living people
1990 births
Alumni of Richmond Drama School
English people of Nigerian descent
English male actors
People from Hammersmith